Learmonth is the name of noble family of Scottish origin from Fife in Scotland. The name Leirmont was among Malcolm III‘s supporters described for the first time by Hector Boece in his "Scotorum historiae a prima gentis origine" printe in Paris in 1527:

According to Boece, Leirmont came from England, among Knights that were sent by Edward the Confessor to support Malcolm in his war with Macbeth to regain his rightful place at King of Scotland. First mention in Fife, Scotland about year 1400 as an individual name Learmont, due to documents from Collection of Sir Robert Douglas of Glenbervie that Learmont was the Laird of Earlston (Earlstone).

History 
 
The Learmonths were an ancient and respectable Scottish noble family. By the sixteenth century the Learmonths had become a powerful clan in eastern Scotland, especially in the region of Fife.

Russia and Sweden 

James Spens who was the son of David Spens and Margaret Learmonth, and James Spens made serious efforts to hire his own kinsmen, including the Learmonths. In the sixteenth and seventeenth centuries many Learmonths served abroad in Continental armies, including those of Sweden, Poland–Lithuania, and Russia.  In the mid-sixteenth century Michael Learmonth became one of the first Scots to attempt to recruit Scottish soldiers for Sweden. It is therefore no surprise to find several Learmonths serving as officers under James Spens’s command in the Swedish army. Among those officers was George Learmonth’s outstanding kinsman, Peter Learmonth, who has occasionally been misidentified as the founder of the Lermontov family.

According to Chester S.L. Dunning's  fundamental story about the Russia's First Civil War in 1598–1613, Peter Learmonth entered Swedish service in 1603 as an ensign, and he rose through the ranks in Colonel James Spens’s regiment. In 1610 Peter Learmonth served as a captain in the Swedish army that was invited by Tsar Vasilii Shuiskii to enter Russia to oppose Polish military intervention. At the battle of Klushino in June 1610 the large Swedish and Russian armies were decisively defeated by a small Polish army. After the battle, over 1500 foreign mercenary soldiers transferred their allegiance to the king of Poland–Lithuania, Sigismund III. In 1619 King Sigismund III rewarded the ‘noble’ and ‘brave’ Scot with a hereditary estate.

In 1632 a new formation cavalry regiment was formed composed of approximately 2000 Russian dvoriane (provincial noblemen) and deti boiarskie (petty gentry) under the command of a high-ranking foreign general.50 Among the officers chosen to train this new cavalry regiment was Lieutenant Iurii Lermont, who was promoted to the rank of captain and given the astronomically high salary of 100 rubles per month. Also joining the same new formation cavalry regiment were two newly-arrived kinsmen of Iurii Lermont– John and Thomas Learmonth.
 Captain Iurii Lermont was given command of a company of 200 cavalrymen, mostly Russian provincial nobles and petty gentry, along with some foreigners who had recently converted to Russian Orthodox Christianity.

Notable members 
George-Yuri Andreevich Learmonth (1590ths – 1633) was a Scottish soldier in Russian service, paternal ancestor of the Lermontov's family.

Notes

References

Further reading
 "Learmonth-Lermontov. A history of the name and families" By Tatiana Molchanova and Rex Learmonth

Learmonth
Fife